Vladimir Grigorevich Boltyansky (26 April 1925 – 16 April 2019), also transliterated as Boltyanski, Boltyanskii, or Boltjansky, was a Soviet and Russian mathematician, educator and author of popular mathematical books and articles.  He was best known for his books on topology, combinatorial geometry and Hilbert's third problem.

Biography 
Boltyansky was born in Moscow. He served in the Soviet army during World War II, when he was a signaller on the 2nd Belorussian Front. He graduated from Moscow University in 1948, where his advisor was Lev Pontryagin.  He defended his "Doktor nauk in physics and mathematics" (higher doctorate) degree in 1955, became a professor in 1959.

Boltyansky was awarded the Lenin Prize (for the work led by Pontryagin, Revaz Gamkrelidze, and ) for applications of differential equations to optimal control, where he was one of the discoverers of the Pontryagin's maximum principle. In 1967 he received Uzbek SSR prize for the work on ordered rings.  He taught at CIMAT.

He was the corresponding member of the Russian Academy of Education. He was the author of over 200 books and mathematical articles.

References

External links 
 
 Boltyansky's biography, in Russian.

1925 births
2019 deaths
Writers from Moscow
20th-century Russian mathematicians
Lenin Prize winners
Moscow State University alumni
Russian Jews
Russian science writers
21st-century Russian mathematicians
Corresponding Members of the USSR Academy of Pedagogical Sciences
Academicians of the Russian Academy of Education
Soviet Jews
Soviet mathematicians
Soviet military personnel of World War II